TanHoldings Football Club (sometimes spelled Tan Holdings), also known as the THFC, is a Marianas Soccer League professional football club which plays in the island of Saipan. It is sponsored by Tan Holdings Corporation.

Former players

  Ryan Relucio

Achievements
M*League Division 1: 
3 titles (2015 Spring, 2016 Spring, 2021 Spring)

Squad

References

Football clubs in the Northern Mariana Islands